The People's Alliance for Progress is a political alliance in Suriname, led by Jules Wijdenbosch. 
At the last legislative elections (25 May 2005), the alliance won 14.5% of the popular vote and 5 out of 51 seats in the National Assembly.
The alliance is formed by:
Democratic National Platform 2000 (Democratisch Nationaal Platform 2000)
Basic Party for Renewal and Democracy (Basispartij voor Vernieuwing en Democratie)
Party for National Unity and Solidarity (Kerukanan Tulodo Pranatan Ingit)

Political party alliances in Suriname